Henry Clyde Pearson (March 12, 1925 – March 26, 2010) was an American lawyer and politician. A veteran of both the House of Delegates and, later, the Senate, he was in 1961, the Republican nominee for Governor of Virginia.

References

External links

1925 births
2010 deaths
Republican Party members of the Virginia House of Delegates
People from Lee County, Virginia
Union College (Kentucky) alumni
University of Richmond alumni
United States Navy personnel of World War II
Republican Party Virginia state senators